Jana Knedlíková (born 22 June 1989) is a Czech handballer for Vipers Kristiansand and the Czech national team.

She participated at the 2018 European Women's Handball Championship.

Achievements
EHF Champions League:
Winner: 2017, 2018, 2019, 2021, 2022
Finalist: 2016
Women Handball International League:
Winner: 2010, 2011
 Czech First Division:
Winner: 2010
Hungarian Championship:
Winner: 2016, 2017, 2018, 2019
Hungarian Cup:
Winner: 2015, 2016, 2018, 2019
Norwegian League:
Winner: 2020/2021, 2021/2022
Norwegian Cup:
Winner: 2020, 2021, 2022/2023

References

External links

1989 births
Living people
Czech female handball players
Expatriate handball players
Czech expatriate sportspeople in Hungary
Czech expatriate sportspeople in Norway
Győri Audi ETO KC players
Sportspeople from Prague